Reggie Lacefield (born April 10, 1945) is an American former professional basketball player. He spent one season in the American Basketball Association (ABA) as a member of the Kentucky Colonels during the 1968–69 season.

Education and career
Lacefield attended Western Michigan University where he was selected in the 12th (155th overall pick) round of the 1968 NBA Draft by the Los Angeles Lakers, but he never played for them.

He played in the Eastern Basketball Association (EBA) from 1968 to 1979 for the Wilmington / Delaware Blue Bombers, Hartford Capitols, Cherry Hill Rookies and Lancaster Red Roses.

References

External links

1945 births
Living people
American men's basketball players
Basketball players from Gary, Indiana
Delaware Blue Bombers players
Hartford Capitols players
Kentucky Colonels players
Lancaster Red Roses (CBA) players
Los Angeles Lakers draft picks
Shooting guards
Small forwards
Western Michigan Broncos men's basketball players
Wilmington Blue Bombers players